"Don't Ask Me Why" is a 1980 song by Billy Joel released as the third single from the album Glass Houses. The song spent two weeks at number one on the Adult Contemporary chart and peaked at number 19 on the Billboard Hot 100.

The track contains all acoustic and Latin percussion instruments performing in an Afro-Cuban rhythmic style. An eclectic, instrumental "Latin Ballroom" piano solo, played over the bridge section after the second verse, is also featured in part of the song; Joel states that the mix for the midsection includes "fifteen pianos overdubbed on top of each other."

Reception
Billboard found the song to be "catchy" and felt that Joel's vocal performance sounded similar to Paul McCartney.  Cash Box said it has a "crisp pop/Latin/rock rhythm" and that the lyrics deal with the "themes of success and chance." Record World called it "one of [Joel's] easy rollin' romantic piano ballads that often become pop standards."

Charts

Weekly charts

Year-end charts

Personnel 
 Billy Joel – lead and backing vocals, acoustic piano, Yamaha electric grand piano
 David Brown – acoustic guitar
 Russell Javors – acoustic guitar
 Doug Stegmeyer – bass
 Liberty DeVitto – maracas, bass drum, triangle, claves, ratchet, castanets

See also
List of number-one adult contemporary singles of 1980 (U.S.)

References

1979 songs
1980 singles
Billy Joel songs
Songs written by Billy Joel
Columbia Records singles
Song recordings produced by Phil Ramone